Lithuania competed at the 2004 Summer Olympics in Athens, Greece, from 13 to 29 August 2004. This was the nation's sixth appearance at the Summer Olympics. The National Olympic Committee of Lithuania (LTOK) sent the nation's smallest delegation to the Games since the 1992 Summer Olympics in Barcelona. A total of 59 athletes, 47 men and 12 women, competed in 13 sports, including the men's basketball team as the nation's team-based sport.

The Lithuanian squad featured returning Olympic medalists: discus thrower Virgilijus Alekna, trap shooter Daina Gudzinevičiūtė, and the men's basketball team, being led by team captain Saulius Štombergas, who later became the nation's flag bearer in the opening ceremony. Along with Alekna, Stombergas, and Gudzineviciute, road cyclists and twin sisters Jolanta and Rasa Polikevičiūtė and javelin thrower Rita Ramanauskaitė made their third Olympic appearances as the most experienced members of the team. Other notable Lithuanian athletes included Stombergas' teammate and NBA basketball star Darius Songaila, track cyclist Simona Krupeckaitė, and two-time world champion Andrejus Zadneprovskis in men's modern pentathlon.

Lithuania left Athens with a total of three medals (one gold and two silver), the lowest in its Summer Olympic history since the 1996 Summer Olympics in Atlanta. Discus thrower Alekna was originally placed in a silver medal spot, but eventually defended his Olympic title at the time of the medal ceremony, when Hungary's Róbert Fazekas committed an anti-doping violation for failing to submit a proper urine sample during the test, which ended up in a disqualification. Meanwhile, heptathlete Austra Skujytė and modern pentathlete Zadneprovskis rounded out the Olympic podium with a silver medal each for the Lithuanian team.

Medalists

Athletics

Lithuanian athletes have so far achieved qualifying standards in the following athletics events (up to a maximum of 3 athletes in each event at the 'A' Standard, and 1 at the 'B' Standard).

Virgilijus Alekna was originally placed in a silver medal position in the men's discus throw. A few days before the medal ceremony took place, Hungary's Róbert Fazekas committed an anti-doping violation by failing to submit a proper urine sample during the test, and was eventually expelled from the Games, lifting Alekna's position to a gold medal and more importantly, a defense for his Olympic title.

Men
Track & road events

Field events

Women
Track & road events

Field events

Combined events – Heptathlon

Basketball

Men's tournament

Roster

Group play

Quarterfinals

Semifinals

Bronze medal final

Boxing

Lithuania sent two boxers to Athens.  One lost his first bout, in the round of 32.  The other won his first to advance to the quarterfinal, where he was defeated.

Canoeing

Sprint

Qualification Legend: Q = Qualify to final; q = Qualify to semifinal

Cycling

Road

Track
Sprint

Pursuit

Time trial

Omnium

Judo

Lithuania has qualified a single judoka.

Modern pentathlon

Two Lithuanian athletes qualified to compete in the modern pentathlon event through the European and UIPM World Championships.

Rowing

Lithuanian rowers qualified the following boats:

Men

Qualification Legend: FA=Final A (medal); FB=Final B (non-medal); FC=Final C (non-medal); FD=Final D (non-medal); FE=Final E (non-medal); FF=Final F (non-medal); SA/B=Semifinals A/B; SC/D=Semifinals C/D; SE/F=Semifinals E/F; R=Repechage

Sailing

Lithuanian sailors have qualified one boat for each of the following events.

Open

M = Medal race; OCS = On course side of the starting line; DSQ = Disqualified; DNF = Did not finish; DNS= Did not start; RDG = Redress given

Shooting 

Lithuania has qualified a single shooter.

Women

Swimming

Lithuanian swimmers earned qualifying standards in the following events (up to a maximum of 2 swimmers in each event at the A-standard time, and 1 at the B-standard time): Vytautas Janušaitis became the first ever Lithuanian swimmer to reach an Olympic final in the men's 200 m individual medley, setting up a new Lithuanian record.

Men

Weightlifting

Lithuanian has qualified a single weightlifter.

Wrestling

Men's Greco-Roman

See also
 Lithuania at the 2004 Summer Paralympics

References

External links
Official Report of the XXVIII Olympiad
National Olympic Committee of Lithuania 

Nations at the 2004 Summer Olympics
2004
Summer Olympics